Art Cruickshank (December 17, 1918 – May 22, 1983) was an American special effects artist who worked at both Disney and 20th Century Fox. Before he was in special effects he was a cameraman at Disney.

Oscars
Both of these were in the category of Best Visual Effects

39th Academy Awards-Fantastic Voyage. Won.
52nd Academy Awards-Nominated for The Black Hole. Nomination shared with Harrison Ellenshaw, Peter Ellenshaw, Joe Hale, Danny Lee and Eustace Lycett. Lost to Alien.

References

External links

Best Visual Effects Academy Award winners
Special effects people
1918 births
1983 deaths
20th Century Studios people
People from Massachusetts